Vincent Grass (born 9 January 1949) is a Belgian actor. He has appeared in a number of both European and American film and television productions, the first being the Belgian television production Siska Van Roosemaal in 1973. Grass played Fiancé in Boris Szulzinger's Mama Dracula (1980) and Doctor Cornelius in the 2008 film The Chronicles of Narnia: Prince Caspian.

Theater

Filmography

Dubbing

References

External links

1949 births
Male actors from Brussels
Belgian male film actors
Belgian male television actors
Living people
20th-century Belgian male actors
21st-century Belgian male actors